1. A dynaset (short for dynamic set) is a set of data that is dynamically linked back to the database. Instead of having the query result stored in a temporary table, where the data cannot be updated directly by the user, the dynaset allows the user to view and update the data contained in the dynaset. Thus, if a university lecturer queried all students who received a distinction in their assignment and found an error in that student's record, they would only need to update the data in the dynaset, which would automatically update the student's database record without the need for them to send a specific update query after storing the query results in a temporary table.

The concept was initially put forth by Dr. E.F. Codd, the inventor of the relational database management system (RDBMS) concept.

2. A dynaset is a temporary set of data taken from one or more tables in the underlying file. A dynaset may be a query that was defined in an Access database, a single table, a subset of a table, or the result of joining multiple tables. A dynaset can be updated if the file is not locked or opened for ReadOnly. The data in the dynaset are "live" i.e., any changes made to the data as a project (in Visual Basic) is executing will appear in the corresponding recordset.  Note: Dynasets created from joining tables are typically non-updateable.

The word "dynaset" was coined by David Risher during a design meeting for Microsoft Access 1.0.

Databases